Satelit is a small urban neighborhood of the city of Novi Sad, Serbia. In English it translates as “Satellite”. It is part of the larger Bistrica urban area and neighborhood.

Borders
The southern border of Satelit is Futoški put (Futog Road), the western border is Bulevar Kneza Miloša (Knez Miloš Boulevard),the eastern border is Bulevar Slobodana Jovanovića (Slobodan Jovanović Boulevard) and the northern border is Bulevar Jovana Dučića (Jovan Dučić Boulevard).

Neighbouring settlements
The neighbouring settlements of Satelit are: Telep on the south, Novo Naselje on the north and east and Veternik on the west.

Parts of Satelit
Some of the parts of Satelit are: Stari Satelit (Old Satelit) and Mali Satelit (Tozinovac).

History
The construction of Satelit began in 1957, when the first houses were built in the area now known as Tozinovac. Mass construction between 1976 and 1980 merged Satelit into the New Neighborhood (Novo Naselje), later named Bistrica. Between 2000 and 2020, most of Tozinovac was dismantled to make way for the Bate Brkića Boulevard extension, connecting it with Futoša street. Several new apartment buildings were constructed in the southern parts of Bate Brkića.

Features
Some of the important features of Satelit are: Satelit Market (Satelitska pijaca), "Autokop" (a factory for production of idle parts for cars), and a stadium of "Mladost" football club. There is also an elementary school "Miloš Crnjanski" in the settlement.

Notable citizens
Dara Bubamara (Rada Adžić), a popular Serbian turbo-folk singer, grew up in Satelit.

See also
Bistrica (Novo Naselje)
Neighborhoods of Novi Sad

References
Jovan Mirosavljević, Brevijar ulica Novog Sada 1745–2001, Novi Sad, 2002.
Zoran Rapajić, Novi Sad bez tajni, Beograd, 2002.

External links

Wetpaint.com, Satelit
Bgnekretnine.net, Detailed map of Novi Sad and Satelit

Novi Sad neighborhoods
Populated places established in 1957